STQ is an Australian television station, licensed to, and serving the regional areas of Queensland. The station is owned and operated by the Seven Network from studios located in Maroochydore on the Sunshine Coast. The callsign STQ stands for Sunshine Television, Queensland.

History
The station began in the 1960s as two different operators:
WBQ-8 Wide Bay/Maryborough, starting on 10 April 1965
MVQ-6 Mackay, starting on 9 August 1968

The licence to operate the commercial television service for the Wide Bay-Burnett region, was awarded to Wide Bay-Burnett Television in October 1962. The company's shareholders included local radio and print media outlets as well as theatre owners Birch, Carroll and Coyle.

The station premises in the Maryborough suburb of Granville housed three studios plus an outdoor space for special presentations. At the time of its launch, WBQ-8 scheduled around 36 hours of programming a week and within two years this had increased to 45 hours per week including extended hours on Wednesday afternoons.

Although MVQ-6 was launched on 9 August 1968, its history dates back to March 1960, when Mackay Television Development Pty Ltd was formed. Maitland Low, general manager of local radio station 4MK, was appointed company manager.

Mackay Television Development Pty Ltd was granted the licence in September 1963. The Mackay licence was one of twenty commercial licences granted as part of the fourth stage of the nationwide rollout of commercial television.

The station was based at studios in Victoria Street, Mackay, and incorporated into new premises planned for radio 4MK. MVQ-6 made its first test pattern transmissions on the evening of Friday, 2 August 1968, giving the station's engineers and local viewers a week to make sure all was working before the official opening a week later.

WBQ changed its callsign in 1977 to SEQ (as in South East Queensland), and its on-air name to "SEQ Sunshine Television", with its slogan Leading the Way. MVQ also changed its on-air name in 1982 to "Tropical Television". The stations were long time broadcaster of Seven Network programs, as well as of Brisbane's Seven News edition on BTQ.

In 1987, after earlier buying SEQ-8, Christopher Skase‘s Qintex Limited, made an offer to buy MVQ-6 which was accepted by the MVQ shareholders. Skase was in the process of selling TVQ-0 in Brisbane as he had also just bought the Seven Network stations in Sydney, Melbourne and Brisbane. This gave MVQ-6 and its new sister station, SEQ-8, access to the Seven Network.

When the regional Queensland television market was aggregated at the end of 1990, SEQ-8 and MVQ-6 operationally merged to become the Sunshine Television Network, and thus became the regional Queensland affiliate of the Seven Network. Sunshine changed the call sign to STQ and adopted its new slogan Love You Queensland with a matching jingle that was based on BTQ's Love You Brisbane from the 1980s. Sunshine also reformatted its news service to match its partner network and a new logo also debuted with the on-air presentation similar to Seven's.

The collapse of Christopher Skase's Qintex empire then saw Sunshine Television Network transfer ownership to Gosford Communications in 1992. In 1995, Reg Grundy's RG Capital lodged an initial $89million bid for the company which was rejected by Sunshine's Board. A revised offer of $105 million was lodged and backed by Sunshine's Charman Trevor Kennedy, however RG Capital's plans were halted when News Corp then purchased a 15% stake in Sunshine Television. Another Seven affiliate, Prime Television, then snapped up 19.9% of Sunshine Television before the Seven Network made a full offer which was successful. This led to Sunshine Television Network changing its name to Seven Queensland and taking on the same logo and on-air look as the Seven Network.

With a few exceptions, its schedule since then has been virtually identical to that of its metropolitan counterpart, BTQ in Brisbane. Seven Queensland won the annual audience ratings for the first time in 1998 against WIN and Southern Cross Ten and has consistently dominated the ratings since.

Prior to August 2017, Seven Queensland was the only regional broadcaster to broadcast 7flix. This was due to Seven West Media owning the network.

On 26 November 2018, STQ switched the main channel from SD to MPEG-2 HD.

News

Seven News bulletins are broadcast each weeknight at 6pm in all seven sub-markets of Aggregated Market A (regional Queensland): Cairns, Townsville, Mackay, Rockhampton, Wide Bay, Toowoomba, the Sunshine Coast. They are followed by an edited 30 minute version of Seven News Brisbane. The bulletins were repeated on a half-hour delay on 7two at 6.30pm, however since July 2020 they are now available on Seven's BVOD service 7plus.

The bulletins are presented by Rob Brough, with Joanne Desmond co-anchoring the Cairns, Townsville, Rockhampton and Toowoomba editions. Nathan Spurling presents sport with Livio Regano presenting weather for all seven sub-regions. Fill-in presenters are Ben Murphy (for Rob Brough), Dannielle DePinto (for Joanne Desmond), Luke McGarry (for Nathan Spurling), and Rosanna Natoli (for Livio Regano).

News bulletins had always been broadcast in the heritage markets of Wide Bay/Sunshine Coast and Mackay from Aggregation in 1990.

In early 2004, Seven News was launched in the Cairns and Townsville sub-markets as a result of regulations regarding local content on regional television introduced by the Australian Broadcasting Authority (now the Australian Communications and Media Authority).

On 22 November 2010, Seven Local News launched a sixth edition for the Rockhampton/Gladstone and Central Queensland region.

A seventh edition for Toowoomba and the Darling Downs was introduced on 2 November 2015, making Seven the only television network to provide a full-scale local news service for every part of regional Queensland, since the axing of WIN News in Mackay in May 2015 and Wide Bay in June 2019.

The most successful edition of Seven News is broadcast on the Sunshine Coast. In early 1998, WIN Television launched a competing service, publicly stating that it would beat Seven in the ratings within six months. At the end of the 1998 ratings season, after a new station head (Laurie Patton) had overseen a comprehensive revamp of the program and its external promotions, Seven Local News had actually increased its audience share by six ratings points.

Reporters and camera crews are based at newsrooms in each of the seven regions with studio presentation for the Cairns, Townsville, Mackay, Rockhampton, Wide Bay and Toowoomba bulletins pre-recorded at studios in Maroochydore. The Sunshine Coast edition of Seven News is broadcast live. News editing is undertaken by the local newsrooms, and sent to the main Maroochydore studios for transmission.

On 5 March 2007, Seven News bulletins commenced production and broadcasts in a widescreen standard-definition digital format. Seven News was the first regional news service in regional Queensland to convert to widescreen.

Main Transmitters

Notes:
1. height above average terrain
2. The Mackay station was an independent station with the callsign MVQ from its 1968 sign-on until aggregation in 1990.
3. The Wide Bay station was an independent station with the callsign WBQ from its 1968 sign-on until 1978, and then SEQ until aggregation in 1990.
4. Analogue transmissions ceased on 6 December 2011, as part of the national shutdown of analogue television.

References

Television stations in Queensland
Seven Network